Oklahoma City hosted the 2006 NCAA Wrestling Team Championship from March 16–18, 2006. 64 teams vied for the NCAA team championship, and over 320 wrestlers competed for individual honors. Oklahoma State University crowned two individual champions (Johny Hendricks at 165 pounds and Jake Rosholt at 197 pounds) and four other Cowboys qualified as All-Americans as the Cowboys earned a dominant victory in the tournament. It was the 4th consecutive NCAA tournament victory by the Cowboys, and their 34th NCAA team wrestling championship overall.

Team results

Championship finals (with NCAA champions in bold)

References
 2006 NCAA Tournament Results

NCAA Division I Wrestling Championship
NCAA
Wrestling competitions in the United States
NCAA Division I  Wrestling Championships
NCAA Division I  Wrestling Championships
NCAA Division I  Wrestling Championships